Soul's Edge is an album by the American blues guitarist and singer Snooks Eaglin, released in 1995 on Black Top Records.

Reception
In his review for AllMusic, Bill Dahl wrote: "Give this New Orleans master enough studio time, and he'll redo the entire history of postwar R&B his own way." The Chicago Reader wrote that "the core blues feel remains, but Eaglin's remarkable flexibility allows him to inhabit nearly any situation with grace, from the furious key-changing blues of bassist George Porter Jr.'s instrumental 'Aw' Some Funk', a real showcase for the guitarist, to the heart-wrenching lament his playing expresses on 'Nine Pound Steel'." The Times-Colonist wrote that "Eaglin drives the band with majestic blues string bending and grace."

Track listing 
 "Josephine" (Fats Domino, Dave Bartholomew) – 6:05    
 "Show Me the Way Back Home" (Willie Tee) – 4:13   
 "Ling Ting Tong" (Mabel Godwin) – 4:00 
 "Aw' Some Funk" (George Porter, Jr.) – 4:55    
 "I'm Not Ashamed" (Don Robey) – 3:40    
 "Nine Pound Steel" (Dan Penn, W. Thompson) – 5:32    
 "Answer Now" (Porter, Eaglin) – 6:01    
 "Skinny Minnie" (Bill Haley, Milt Gabler, Rusty Keefer, Catherine Cafra) – 4:14    
 "Thrill on the Hill" (Hank Ballard) – 2:51     
 "You and Me" (Porter, Eaglin) – 6:13
 "I Went to the Mardi Gras" (Eaglin, Ridgely, Scott) – 4:44       
 "Talk to Me" (Joe Seneca) – 5:23     
 "Mama and Papa" (Earl King) – 4:00
 "God Will Take Care" (Traditional) – 4:17

Personnel 
Snooks Eaglin – vocals, guitar
Sammy Berfect – organ, piano
David Torkanovsky – piano on 3, 7, 9, 11
George Porter Jr. – bass, 2nd vocal on 7
Herman V. Ernest III – drums, percussion
Fred Kemp – tenor sax
Ward Smith – tenor sax, baritone sax
Steve Howard – trumpet
Rick Trolsen – trombone

References 

1995 albums
Snooks Eaglin albums
Black Top Records albums